Riedewald is a surname. Notable people with the surname include:

 Harold Riedewald, Surinamese lawyer
 Jaïro Riedewald (born 1996), Dutch footballer
 Raimund Riedewald (born 1986), Dutch footballer

See also
 Riederwald, district of Frankfurt, Germany